The Harvard Crimson finished with a win–loss record of 33 wins and 1 loss. Of the 31 wins, the Crimson won 30 consecutive games to close the season.
The final game of that 30 game streak was a 6-5 overtime victory over the New Hampshire Wildcats women's ice hockey program in the AWCHA national championship game. During the season, the Crimson would win the Beanpot and Ivy League title.  In addition, the Crimson won their first ECAC regular-season and tournament championships.

Awards and honors
A,J. Mleczko, Patty Kazmaier Award
Tammy Lee Shewchuk, 1999 ECAC All-Tournament team
 Katey Stone, ECAC/KOHO Coach of the Year honors
 Katey Stone, New England Hockey Writers’ Coach of the Year honors
 Katey Stone, American Hockey Coaches Association Women’s Coach of the Year 
 Katey Stone, New England College Athletic Conference Women’s Division I Coach of the Year.

References

External links
Official Site

Harvard Crimson women's ice hockey seasons
Harvard
Har
Harvard Crimson women's ice hockey
Harvard Crimson women's ice hockey
Harvard Crimson women's ice hockey
Harvard Crimson women's ice hockey